Ymer Deliallisi (1872 - 1944) was a 19th-century Albanian politician. He was one of the signatories of the Albanian Declaration of Independence.

References

19th-century Albanian people
Signatories of the Albanian Declaration of Independence
Members of the Parliament of Albania
People from Shijak
All-Albanian Congress delegates
Congress of Durrës delegates
1944 deaths
1872 births